Plagigeyeria conilis is a species of very small or minute freshwater snail with an operculum, an aquatic gastropod mollusk in the family Hydrobiidae. This species is endemic to France.

References

 Bouchet, P. 1996.  Plagigeyeria conilis.   2006 IUCN Red List of Threatened Species.   Downloaded on 7 August 2007.

Plagigeyeria
Endemic molluscs of Metropolitan France
Gastropods described in 1974
Taxonomy articles created by Polbot